Russell Hagg (born 1938) is an Australian designer and director. He studied architecture at Melbourne University before becoming a designer in British films, then worked for Crawford Productions as a writer and director.

Select credits
 A Clockwork Orange (1971) - art director
 Cash and Company - TV series
 Tandarra - TV series
 Raw Deal (1977) - director
 BMX Bandits (1983) - writer

References

External links
 

1938 births
Living people
Australian film directors